"Shots" is a song performed by American electro recording duo LMFAO featuring American rapper Lil Jon. It was released as the third single from the first album Party Rock. The song was written by Jonathan Smith, Skyler Austen Gordy, Stefan Kendal Gordy, and Eric Delatorre.

In the 2010s, Shots became a go-to drinking anthem and pub song, it can also be a communal drinking song, citing the repetitive chorus chant of "Shots, Shots, Shots!" being used colloquially. 13 years later, during the COVID-19 pandemic, Shots was used as an incentive at pharmacies and clinics in North America as a celebratory song for the general public getting vaccinated, being a word play for the COVID-19 "shot" or "jab".

Music video
The music video for the song was uploaded to YouTube on December 4, 2009. The video was filmed at Tao Beach at the Venetian Hotel in Las Vegas. The video begins with people sunbathing at the Tao Beach pool. Suddenly, Lil Jon, LMFAO, Q, Eric D-Lux and many others appear out of nowhere and began singing the song. The video also features GoonRock, who later appears in LMFAO's hit singles "Party Rock Anthem" and "Champagne Showers".

Track listings
Album version
"Shots" (Explicit version) – 3:42
"Shots" (Clean version) – 3:39

Digital download
"Shots" (Dummejungs Remix) – 5:06
"Shots" (Electro Remix) – 4:48

Credits and personnel
Lead vocals – LMFAO and Lil Jon
Additional vocals – Eric D-Lux
Lyrics –  Jonathan Smith, Skyler Austen Gordy, Stefan Kendal Gordy, Eric Delatorre
Label: Interscope, will.i.am, Cherrytree

Popular culture

A variation of the song was used in a television spot commercial for the DreamWorks Animation film, Puss in Boots.
Bowdoin College's hockey teams play this song when the Polar Bears score a goal.
The song was used for promotion of the 2012 comedy film, That's My Boy.
The chorus was used and covered in the 2012 episode "Can I Be Frank (With You)" on American Dad! by Francine (voiced by Wendy Schaal) with Klaus and Roger dancing because of Francine wanting to "party" with her husband (Stan Smith)  who instead would rather do it with his friends.
The song was used as the basis of a parody of The Hobbit by Hillywood Show.
At the beginning of the video, a teenage girl is reading a magazine with the Jonas Brothers on the cover.
A small section of the song was used in the film American Reunion.
The song was featured in promos for the South Park Vaccination Special

Charts

Certifications

References 

2009 singles
LMFAO songs
Lil Jon songs
Songs about alcohol
2009 songs
Songs written by Sky Blu (rapper)
Songs written by Redfoo
Cherrytree Records singles
Interscope Records singles
Crunk songs